Willem de Waal (born 17 February 1978 in Paarl, South Africa) is a South African rugby union footballer who is currently playing for Benetton Treviso in the Pro14 competition. He plays in the position of fly-half. Like Joost van der Westhuizen at scrum-half, de Waal is unusually big for a fly-half.

Career
De Waal played rugby for Stellenbosch University before making his provincial debut with the Leopards in 2002. He then moved to the Free State Cheetahs in 2004 where he would experience his greatest success so far. In each of his four seasons at the club, the Cheetahs made it to the final of the Currie Cup, winning twice and sharing one.

De Waal has also played at Super Rugby level, making his debut with the Bulls in 2004 before joining the Cats in 2005. When the competition expanded to 14 teams in 2006, the Cats split into two separate franchises – the Lions and the Cheetahs, which de Waal joined.

On 24 July 2007, it was announced that de Waal signed a two-year deal with French Second Division club RC Narbonne. He returned to South Africa after one season and secured a spot in the 2009 Stormers squad, his fourth different super rugby team. He also played in the Currie Cup for Western Province that same season.

External links 

1978 births
Living people
Afrikaner people
South African rugby union players
Rugby union fly-halves
Stormers players
Western Province (rugby union) players
Cheetahs (rugby union) players
Free State Cheetahs players
Bulls (rugby union) players
Lions (United Rugby Championship) players
South African people of Dutch descent
Sportspeople from Paarl
Stellenbosch University alumni
Benetton Rugby players
South African expatriate rugby union players
Expatriate rugby union players in Italy
South African expatriate sportspeople in Italy
Rugby union players from the Western Cape